Craig Dean Middleton (born 10 September 1970) is an English retired football midfielder.

Middleton began his career at Coventry City, alongside his twin brother Lee, before moving to Cambridge United in 1993. He made a number of appearances in his first year but missed the whole of the following season, 1994–95. He did manage to return to the side but a shoulder injury towards the end of the season meant he was released by the club in 1996. He signed for Cardiff City and quickly became a first team regular and would be a vital part of the Cardiff team for the next three years before falling out of favour and, after a short loan spell at Plymouth Argyle, left to join Halifax Town.

References

1970 births
Living people
English footballers
Coventry City F.C. players
Cambridge United F.C. players
Cardiff City F.C. players
Plymouth Argyle F.C. players
Halifax Town A.F.C. players
Premier League players
Sportspeople from Nuneaton
English Football League players
Twin sportspeople
English twins
Association football midfielders